Darío Herrera (1870-1914) was a Panamanian Modernismo poet and diplomat. He placed great importance on the example given by contemporary French writing. His most important work is Horas lejanas y otros cuentos, a collection of short stories (published Buenos Aires 1903)

References

External links
 
 

Modernismo
Modernist poets
Panamanian poets
Panamanian male writers
Male poets
1870 births
1914 deaths